Federico is a given name and surname. It is a form of Frederick, most commonly found in Spanish, Portuguese and Italian.

People with the given name Federico

Artists

 Federico Ágreda, Venezuelan composer and DJ.
 Federico Aguilar Alcuaz, renowned Filipino painter.
 Federico Andahazi, Argentine writer and psychologist.
 Federico Casagrande, Italian jazz guitarist
 Federico Castelluccio, Italian-American actor who is most famous for his role as Furio Giunta on the HBO TV series, The Sopranos
 Federico Cortese, Italian conductor, Music Director of the Boston Youth Symphony Orchestras and the Harvard Radcliffe Orchestra
 Federico Elizalde, Filipino marksman and musician
 Federico Fellini, Italian film-maker and director
 Federico García Lorca, Spanish poet and playwright
 Federico Luppi, Argentine film, TV, radio and theatre actor
 Federico Ricci, Italian composer

Athletes

 Federico Bruno (born 1993), Argentine distance runner
Federico Chiesa, Italian footballer currently playing for Juventus
 Federico de Beni, Italian road bicycle racer
 Federico del Bonis, Argentine tennis player
 Federico Hernán Domínguez, Argentine football right back who currently plays for River Plate of the Primera División de Argentina
 Federico Insúa, Argentine footballer who plays in the hole for Boca Juniors
 Federico Lopez, Puerto Rican basketball player
 Federico Luzzi, Italian tennis player who died of leukaemia
 Federico Macheda, Italian football striker currently playing for Novara FC
 Federico Mociulsky, Argentine footballer
 Federico Moreira, Uruguayan road bicycle racer and track cyclist 
 Federico Muñoz, Colombian road cyclist
 Federico Mussini, Italian college basketball player currently playing with St. John's University Red Storm
 Federico Nieto, Argentine footballer currently playing for Club Colón de Santa Fe
 Federico Piovaccari, Italian footballer
 Federico Turienzo, Argentine footballer
 Federico Valverde, Uruguayan footballer currently playing for Real Madrid
 Federico Bernardeschi, Italian footballer

Military figures

 Federico, Visigoth general and brother of Theodoric II who died at the Battle of Orleans

Politicians

 Federico Chávez, Paraguay politician and soldier who served as President of Paraguay from September 10, 1949 to May 5, 1954
 Federico Degetau, Puerto Rican politician, lawyer, and author
Federico D'Incà, Italian politician
 Federico Döring, Mexican right-wing politician from Mexico City affiliated to the National Action Party
 Federico Errázuriz Echaurren, Chilean political figure
 Federico Errázuriz Zañartu, Chilean political figure
 Federico Gozi, Captain Regent of San Marino from October 1629 to March 1630 and again in 1634 from April to September
 Federico Páez, President of Ecuador
 Federico Pinedo, Argentine politician
 Federico Tinoco Granados, President of Costa Rica
 Juan Federico Ponce Vaides, the acting President of Guatemala from 4 July 1944 to 20 October 1944
 Federico II di Svevia

Scientists

 Federico Capasso, one of the inventors of the quantum cascade laser during his work at Bell Laboratories
 Federico Mena, Mexican computer programmer

People with the surname Federico
Giovanni Federico, Italian-German footballer
Pasquale Joseph Federico, American patent attorney and mathematician
Leopoldo Federico, Argentine tango bandoneonist

See also
 Frederick (disambiguation)
 Fred (disambiguation)
 Freddie (disambiguation)
 Freddo
 Freddy (disambiguation)
 Frédéric
 Frederico
 Fredrik
 Fredro
 Fredy
 Friedrich (disambiguation)
 Fryderyk (disambiguation)

Italian masculine given names
Spanish masculine given names